The British Virgin Islands competed at the 14th Pan American Games held in Santo Domingo, Dominican Republic from August 1 to August 17, 2003.

Results by event

See also
 British Virgin Islands at the 2004 Summer Olympics

References

Nations at the 2003 Pan American Games
Pan American Games
2003